Djibril Sidibé (born 29 July 1992) is a French professional footballer who plays as a defender for Greek Super League club AEK Athens.

Club career

Early career
Sidibé plays as a full back, but can also be utilized in midfield. He began his career at his hometown club Troyes in 2000 at the age of eight. Sidibé made his club debut during the 2009–10 season while the club was playing in the Championnat National, the third division of French football. He made his professional debut on 17 September 2010 in a league match against Grenoble.

Lille
After helping earn Troyes promotion to Ligue 1, the 19-year-old signed for Lille in July 2012, as cover for Mathieu Debuchy.  Sidibé made his debut for Lille on 25 August 2012 against OGC Nice, the start was his first appearance in Ligue 1 and he marked it with a goal, scoring a 59' minute equalizer in a 2–2 draw. In Lille's 2012–13 UEFA Champions League group stage matchday 5 game against BATE Borisov in Minsk on 20 November, Sidibé helped Lille avenge their 3–1 matchday 1 home defeat against BATE Borisov by scoring from a long angled strike in the first half. Sidibé was sent off in the second half, for a second bookable offense, but Lille held on for a 2–0 victory, securing their only points of their 2012–13 UEFA Champions League group stage campaign.

Sidibé scored Lille's equalizing goal against Paris Saint-Germain in the 2016 Coupe de la Ligue Final; however PSG won the match 2–1.

Monaco
On 8 July 2016, Sidibé joined Monaco on a five-year deal. On 22 November, Sidibé headed home Benjamin Mendy's cross for Monaco's first goal in the 48th minute and provided the assist for Thomas Lemar in the 53rd minute to enable Monaco to defeat Tottenham Hotspur 2–1 at home in the 2016–17 UEFA Champions League group stage Group E matchday 5 match and ensure that Monaco would finish on top of Group E at the conclusion of the group matches on 7 December.

In his first season with Monaco, Sidibé played an integral role as the club won the Ligue 1 title for the first time in 17 years and he was named to the UNFP Ligue 1 Team of the Year.

Loan to Everton
On 7 August 2019, Sidibé joined Premier League side Everton on an initial season-long loan; the deal included an option to make the move permanent at the end of the loan.

AEK Athens
On 9 September 2022, Sidibé joined Greek Super League side AEK Athens on a two-year deal.

International career 

Sidibé was on stand by for France's UEFA Euro 2016 squad.

On 25 August 2016, Sidibé was called up to the senior squad for the first time for a friendly against Italy and a 2018 FIFA World Cup qualification against Belarus. He made his debut on 1 September against the former at the Stadio San Nicola playing the whole match in a 3–1 victory.

Sidibé scored his first goal for France in their 3–2 friendly victory over England on 13 June 2017.

On 17 May 2018, he was called up to the 23-man French squad for the 2018 FIFA World Cup in Russia.

Personal life
Sidibé is a Muslim of Malian descent.

Career statistics

Club

International 

As of match played 26 June 2018. France score listed first, score column indicates score after each Sidibé goal.

Honours 
Lille

 Coupe de la Ligue runner-up: 2015–16

Monaco
Ligue 1: 2016–17

 Coupe de France runner-up: 2020–21
 Coupe de la Ligue runner-up: 2016–17, 2017–18

France
 FIFA World Cup: 2018

Individual
 UNFP Ligue 1 Team of the Year: 2016–17

Orders
 Knight of the Legion of Honour: 2018

References

External links 

 
 

1992 births
French Muslims
Living people
Sportspeople from Troyes
Footballers from Grand Est
French footballers
France youth international footballers
France under-21 international footballers
France international footballers
Association football defenders
ES Troyes AC players
Lille OSC players
AS Monaco FC players
Everton F.C. players
AEK Athens F.C. players
Championnat National players
Ligue 2 players
Championnat National 2 players
Ligue 1 players
Premier League players
Super League Greece players
2018 FIFA World Cup players
FIFA World Cup-winning players
Chevaliers of the Légion d'honneur
Black French sportspeople
French sportspeople of Malian descent
French expatriate footballers
French expatriate sportspeople in Greece
French expatriate sportspeople in England
Expatriate footballers in England
Expatriate footballers in Greece